The Policía Canaria are the police force of the autonomous community of the Canary Islands, Spain. It was formed in 2010 by Paulino Rivero, the President of the Canary Islands.

Role
The Ley del Cuerpo General de la Policía Canaria, passed on 28 May 2008 by the Parliament of the Canary Islands, states that the functions of the police force include the guarding and protection of people, organs, buildings, facilities and installations of the autonomous community and its instrumental bodies, and to ensure compliance with the regulations and orders issued by the organs of the community, among others.

This regional police work consists of the General Police Corps Canaria and the local police bodies of the 88 Canary Island municipalities. Only these first 100 officers make up the General Corps.

One hundred officers, 92 men and 8 women, made up the first promotion of the Canary Islands Police in a presentation ceremony held on June 30, 2010 at the Canary Islands Academy of Public Safety in Santa Cruz de Tenerife. The regional president said that this was only the first step in a deployment that will reach 1,700 officers in several phases.

Its first mission was to celebrate the Festival of the Virgen de las Nieves, on the island of La Palma.

Ranks

 (Police trainee)
 (Police officer)
 (Police corporal)
 (Police sergeant)
 (Police lieutenant)
 (Deputy police inspector)
 (Police inspector)
 (Assistant chief of police)
 (Chief of police)
Source:

References

External links
 Official site

Canary Islands
2010 establishments in Spain
Canarian law
Organisations based in the Canary Islands